Frank McGuire (born 16 June 1957) is an Australian politician representing the Victorian Legislative Assembly seat of Broadmeadows for the Labor Party since the 2011 Broadmeadows by-election. McGuire was a journalist, political adviser, and business consultant prior to entering politics.

Journalism
Prior to becoming a politician, McGuire was a journalist and the winner of two Walkley Awards for excellence in journalism. The first was in 1993, when he won the investigative report award for a segment called 'Deadly Force' that screened on ABC TV's Four Corners program in May 1992. In 2007, he won with fellow journalist Adam Shand, for a report on Nine Network's Sunday program, called "Force within a force" which was about alleged police corruption.

McGuire's experience includes being a news reporter at the Melbourne Herald (1976–1984); reporter/producer/deputy chief-of-staff on Ten News (1986–1990). He was a current affairs investigative and political reporter on The 7.30 Report (1990–1991) and on Four Corners (1992–1993).

Local government taskforce
In 1999, McGuire was the founding chair of the City of Hume's Hume Safe City Taskforce, and served until 2004..

Political career
McGuire has served in several Parliamentary Secretary roles, including the Medical Research, Small Business, and Innovation portfolios.

In December 2021 he lost Labor preselection for the 2022 Victorian state election. He was succeeded by Kathleen Matthews-Ward.

Honours and awards
Walkley Award, 1993 and 2007
Human Rights Television News and Current Affair Award, 1995
Rotary International Paul Harris Fellow, 2003 
Hume City Council Award, 2010

Personal life

McGuire was raised in Broadmeadows and lives in the inner Melbourne suburb of Fitzroy. McGuire and his brother, media personality and ex-Collingwood Football Club president, Eddie McGuire, were educated at Christian Brothers College in St Kilda on a scholarship. 

McGuire is a keen follower of AFL football team, Essendon. McGuire has three children.

References

External links
 Parliamentary voting record of Frank McGuire at Victorian Parliament Tracker
 Member of Victorian Parliament
 Personal web site

1957 births
Living people
Members of the Victorian Legislative Assembly
Australian Labor Party members of the Parliament of Victoria
Australian television journalists
Journalists from Melbourne
Walkley Award winners
Scottish emigrants to Australia
Australian people of Irish descent
21st-century Australian politicians
The Herald (Melbourne) people
People from Broadmeadows, Victoria
Politicians from Hamilton, South Lanarkshire
Politicians from Melbourne
People educated at St Mary's College, Melbourne